Ludwig Paischer (born 28 November 1981 in Oberndorf bei Salzburg) is an Austrian judoka.

Currently he lives in Japan.

Achievements

References

External links

 
 

1981 births
Living people
Austrian male judoka
Judoka at the 2004 Summer Olympics
Judoka at the 2008 Summer Olympics
Judoka at the 2012 Summer Olympics
Judoka at the 2016 Summer Olympics
Olympic judoka of Austria
Olympic silver medalists for Austria
Olympic medalists in judo
Medalists at the 2008 Summer Olympics
Judoka at the 2015 European Games
European Games competitors for Austria
21st-century Austrian people